Luka Peroš (born 28 October 1976) is a Croatian actor best known for the role of Marseille in Money Heist.

Peroš is a polyglot and multilingual, being able to speak eight different languages. He speaks fluent English.

Early life
Peroš graduated American Community School of Abu Dhabi in 1995.

Filmography

 The Three Men of Melita Žganjer (1998) as Americki vojnik
 Kanjon opasnih igara (1998) as Zlatan
 Četverored (1999)
 La Femme Musketeer (2004, TV Mini-Series) as Funeral Musketeer
 Zabranjena ljubav (2006, TV Series) as Adrijan Tomas
 The Hunting Party (2007) as Commando #1
 Bitange i princeze (2008, TV Series) as Strazar
 Will Not End Here (2008) as Vojvoda
 Niciji sin (2008) as Policajac
 Zakon! (2009, TV Series) as Brat Teofil
 Max Schmeling (2010) as Referee Smith / Journalist #2
 Forest Creatures (2010) as Mladen
 BloodRayne: The Third Reich (2011) as Boris
 Blubberella (2011) as Boris
 Larin izbor (2012, TV Series) as Crni
 Larin izbor: Izgubljeni princ (2012) as Crni
 Tasting Menu (2013) as Louis
 Panzer Chocolate (2013) as Peter (Policeman)
 Number 55 (2014) as Franjo
 El Niño (2014) as Murat
 Steppeulven (2014)
 Borgia (2014, TV Series) as Imola Man
 Mar de plástico (2015, TV Series) as Eric
 Kud puklo da puklo (2015, TV Series) as Recepcioner
 Mine (2016) as Delta Force #1
 Wasn't Afraid to Die (2016) as Austrian arms dealer
 Megan Leavey (2017) as Drunk Guy in Bar
 Papillon (2017) as Santini
 The Tree of Blood (2018) as Dimitri
 The Photographer of Mauthausen (2018) as Schulz
 Intrigo: Dear Agnes (2019) as Client
 While at War (2019) as Bernhardt
 Los Rodríguez y el más allá (2019) as Raúl
 Money Heist (also known as La Casa de Papel) (2019-2021, TV Series) as Jakov / Marseille
 Black Beach (2020) as Negociador (Leo Babich)
 El arte de volver (2021)

References

External links 

1976 births
Living people
Croatian male film actors
Male actors from Zagreb
Croatian male television actors
20th-century Croatian male actors
21st-century Croatian male actors